Brothers of the Head is a 2005 mockumentary featuring the story of Tom and Barry Howe (Harry and Luke Treadaway respectively), conjoined twins living in the United Kingdom. It was based on the 1977 novel of the same name by science fiction writer Brian Aldiss.

Tony Grisoni started working on the screenplay in 1984. He met the directors when they were filming Lost in La Mancha about the making of The Man Who Killed Don Quixote.

Plot
In the early 1970s, the twins are essentially purchased by a sleazy talent manager with plans to turn them into rock stars.  The brothers form a pub rock band called the Bang Bang. As the band's success grows, a music journalist, Laura (Tania Emery), follows the band writing an article. A romantic relationship develops between Laura and Tom causing friction between the two brothers.

Cast
Luke Treadaway as Barry Howe
Harry Treadaway as Tom Howe
Sean Harris as Nick Sidney
Bryan Dick as Paul Day
Tania Emery as Laura Ashwood
Jonathan Pryce as Henry Couling
Jane Horrocks as Roberta Howe
Howard Attfield as Zak Bedderwick
Ken Russell as himself
James Greene as Brian Aldiss
Luke Wagner as Young Zak

External links
Brothers of the Head on Brian Aldiss's official site

2005 films
British mockumentary films
2005 comedy-drama films
British independent films
British comedy-drama films
Film4 Productions films
2000s English-language films
2000s British films